The women's shortboard competition at the 2020 Summer Olympics in Tokyo was held from 25 to 27 July at the Shidashita Beach, or "Shida", located about 40 miles (64 km) outside of Tokyo in Chiba.

The medals for the competition were presented by Bernard Rajzman, IOC Member, one Olympian, and Silver Medalist, Brazil; and the medalists' bouquets were presented by Fernando Aguerre, ISA President; United States.

Background 
This was the first time the surfing is held at the Olympics; it was one of five temporary sports selected for Tokyo 2020. Surfing has also been selected as a temporary sport for 2024 Summer Olympics in Paris, France.

Qualification 

Quota places were allocated to the athletes at the following events:

 Host Country: Japan as host country is allocated 1 place in both men's and women's events. If at least one Japanese surfer has earned a qualification place through other events, the relevant Host Country Place(s) shall be reallocated to the next highest ranked eligible athlete at the 2020 World Surfing Games.
 2019 World Surf League Championship Tour – the 10 highest ranked men and 8 highest ranked women will be awarded quota places.
 2019 ISA World Surfing Games – the top finishers from each continent with the exception of the Americas will be awarded a quota place.
 2019 Pan American Games – the top finisher in men's and women's events will be awarded a quota place.
 2021 ISA World Surfing Games – the top 4 men and 6 women will be awarded quota places. If a NOC or National Olympic Committee qualifies more than the maximum number of athletes, the 2021 ISA World Surfing Games will prevail and any places earned from 2019 will be reawarded to the next highest finishing athlete(s).

There is a maximum of 2 men and 2 women per NOC.

Competition format 
The competition consists of six rounds:

 Round 1: 5 heats of 4 surfers each; the top 2 in each heat (10 total) advance to round 3 while the other 2 from each heat (10 total) go to round 2 (essentially a repechage)
 Round 2: 2 heats of 5 surfers each; the top 3 in each heat (6 total) advance to round 3 while the other 2 in each heat (4 total) are eliminated
 Round 3: Head-to-head competition starts with this round of 16 (8 heats of 2 surfers each; winner advances, loser eliminated)
 Quarterfinals
 Semifinals
 Final and bronze medal match

The length of each heat (20 to 35 minutes) and the maximum number of waves each surfer can ride are determined by the technical director ahead of the day of competition. Scoring for each wave is from 0 to 10, with the best two waves for each surfer counting. Scores are based on the difficulty of manoeuvres performed, innovation and progression, variety, combination, speed, power, and flow of each manoeuvre.

Schedule

Competition took place over 3 days between 25 July and 27 July. Due to a tropical storm the inaugural Olympic surfing finals were moved from Thursday 29 July to Tuesday 27 July.

Results

Round 1 
The first round is non-elimination. Surfers are seeded into five heats of four surfers each, with the top two surfers advancing straight to Round 3. The bottom two surfers are seeded into Round 2, the first elimination round.

Heat 1

Heat 2

Heat 3

Heat 4

Heat 5

Round 2

The top three surfers from each heat in Round 2 advance to Round 3. The bottom two surfers from each heat are eliminated.

Heat 1

Heat 2

Round 3
The winner from each head-to-head heat qualifies to the next round.

References 

Surfing at the 2020 Summer Olympics
Women's events at the 2020 Summer Olympics
Women's surfing